My So-Called Band was a punk rock band from Charlotte, North Carolina, active in the 1990s and 2000s.

History
The band was started in 1995 by singer-bassist Chris Peigler, guitarist Luke Warm, and drummer Patrick Korson. Prior thereto, Peigler had been a member of several other bands, including Intensive Care and Proletariat Madonna, and has also contributed to the fanzine Razorcake. In 2001, they started their own record label known as "Suicide Watch Records". In 2002, they began recording their third album, Always Something There To Destroy Me, at the Recording Den with Mark Puerello. Their Final Record Weapon of Mass Destruction was recorded and released in 2004, after which, Peigler and, then drummer, Kevin Gavagan formed the band Rogue Nations with long time friend Eric Seitlin.

Style
My So-Called Band's music, which was made deliberately to sound like that of pioneering punk rock musicians, has been described as "like Steve Forbert might've [sounded] if he'd fronted the MC5 while on the lam from all those Next Big Dylan delusionals," and like what would happen if "the Clash and The Ramones had mixed their musical chromosomes." They were also called " the Charlotte, N.C., answer to modern punk-rock" by Sarah Lee.

Peigler's death
Peigler died on January 8, 2014, at the age of 50.

Discography
My So-Called Band (1997)  - Yesha
The Punk Girl Next Door (2000)  - Yesha
Always Something There to Destroy Me (2003)  - A1s
Weapons of Mass Distortion (2004)  - SW Records

References

Rock music groups from North Carolina
1995 establishments in North Carolina
American punk rock groups
Musical groups established in 1995
Musical groups disestablished in 2004
2004 disestablishments in North Carolina